Latifa Bennani-Smires is a Moroccan politician. Alongside Badia Skalli, she became one of the first two women in the House of Representatives when she was elected to parliament in 1993.

Biography
The head of the women's section of the Istiqlal Party, Bennani-Smires was a candidate for the 1993 parliamentary and was one of two women elected to the House of Representatives, becoming the first women in the Parliament of Morocco. She was re-elected in 1997, 2002 and 2007. During her final term she served as chair of the Istiqlal group in the House of Representatives.

References

Living people
Moroccan women in politics
Members of the House of Representatives (Morocco)
Istiqlal Party politicians
Year of birth missing (living people)
21st-century Moroccan women politicians
21st-century Moroccan politicians